Robert C. McLeod (born March 3, 1960 in Aklavik, Northwest Territories, Canada) is a former Canadian politician, who represented the electoral district of Inuvik Twin Lakes in the Legislative Assembly of the Northwest Territories from 2004 to 2019.

Prior to his election to the legislature, he worked as a carpenter and private contractor.

McLeod was first elected in a by-election held on November 29, 2004. He served until the 2019 Northwest Territories general election, when he retired from politics.

References

1960 births
Members of the Legislative Assembly of the Northwest Territories
Living people
People from Inuvik
People from Aklavik
Inuit from the Northwest Territories
21st-century Canadian politicians
Members of the Executive Council of the Northwest Territories